Arnhem Land is a historical region of the Northern Territory of Australia, with the term still in use. In 1623, Dutch East India Company captain Willem Joosten van Colster (or Coolsteerdt) sailed into the Gulf of Carpentaria and Cape Arnhem is named after his ship, the Arnhem, which itself was named after the city of Arnhem in the Netherlands.

Two regions are often distinguished as East Arnhem (Land) and West Arnhem (Land), and North-east Arnhem Land is known to the local Yolŋu people as Miwatj.
for bauxite. Other major population centres are Yirrkala (just outside Nhulunbuy), Gunbalanya (formerly Oenpelli), Ramingining, and Maningrida.

A substantial proportion of the population, which is mostly Aboriginal, lives on small outstations or homelands. This outstation movement started in the early 1980s. Many Aboriginal groups moved to usually very small settlements on their traditional lands, often to escape the problems of the larger towns. These population groups have very little Western cultural influence, and Arnhem Land is arguably one of the last areas in Australia that could be seen as a completely separate country. Many of the region's leaders have called and continue to call for a treaty that would allow the Yolŋu to operate under their own traditional laws.

In 2019, it was announced that NASA had chosen Arnhem Land as the location for a space launch facility, the Arnhem Space Centre. On 27 June 2022, NASA launched the first rocket there, the first rocket launch from a commercial spaceport outside the US, and two further launches followed within weeks.

History

Arnhem Land has been occupied by Aboriginal peoples for tens of thousands of years and is the location of the oldest-known stone axe, which scholars believe to be 35,500 years old.

Prehistoric warfare 
Rock art depicting what may be acts of violence between hunter-gatherers in Arnhem land has been tentatively dated to 10,000 years ago.

Makassan contact

At least since the 18th century (and probably earlier) Muslim traders from Makassar of Sulawesi visited Arnhem Land each year to trade, harvest, and process sea cucumbers or trepang. This marine animal is highly prized in Chinese cuisine, for folk medicine, and as an aphrodisiac.

This Makassan contact with Australia is the first recorded example of interaction between the inhabitants of the Australian continent and their Asian neighbours.

This contact had a major effect on local Aboriginal Australians. The Makassans exchanged goods such as cloth, tobacco, knives, rice, and alcohol for the right to trepang coastal waters and employ local labour. Makassar pidgin became a lingua franca along the north coast among several indigenous Australian groups who were brought into greater contact with each other by the seafaring Makassan culture.

These traders from the southwest corner of Sulawesi also introduced the word balanda for white people, long before western explorers set foot on the coasts of northern Australia. In Arnhem Land, the word is still widely used today to refer to white Australians. The Dutch started settling in Sulawesi Island in the early 17th century.

Archaeological remains of Makassar contact, including trepang processing plants (drying, smoking) from the 18th and 19th centuries, are still found at Australian locations such as Port Essington and Groote Eylandt. The Makassans also planted tamarind trees (native to Madagascar and East Africa). After processing, the sea cucumbers were traded by the Makassans to Southern China.

In 2014, an 18th-century Chinese coin was found in the remote area of Wessel Islands off the coast on a beach on Elcho Island during a historical expedition. The coin was found near previously known Makassan trepanger fishing sites where several other Dutch coins have been discovered nearby, but never a Chinese coin. The coin was probably made in Beijing around 1735.

Florida Station

In 1884, 10,000 square miles of Arnhem Land was sold by the colonial British government to cattle grazier, John Arthur Macartney. The property was called Florida Station and Macartney stocked it with cattle overlanded from Queensland. Monsoonal flooding, disease and strong resistance from the local Aboriginal population resulted in Florida Station being abandoned by Macartney in 1893. The first manager of the property, Jim Randell, bolted a swivel cannon to the verandah of the homestead to keep the Indigenous people away, while Jack Watson, the last manager of the property, reportedly "wiped out a lot" of "the blacks" living on the coast at Blue Mud Bay.
During the period of Watson's management, another large massacre is recorded to have happened at Mirki on the north coast of Florida Station. The Yolngu people today remember this massacre where many people including children were shot dead.

Eastern and African Cold Storage Supply Company
From 1903 to 1908, the property rights of much of Arnhem Land were held by the Eastern and African Cold Storage Supply Company. This Anglo-Australian consortium leased the region under the name of Arafura cattle station and attempted to construct a massive cattle raising and meat production industry. The company employed roving gangs of armed men to shoot the resident Aboriginal population.

Land rights
In 1971, the Gove land rights case (Milirrpum v Nabalco Pty Ltd) was the first litigation on native title in Australia, and the first significant legal case for Aboriginal land rights in Australia.

Geography

The area is from Port Roper on the Gulf of Carpentaria around the coast to the East Alligator River, where it adjoins Kakadu National Park. The major centres are Jabiru on the Kakadu National Park border, Maningrida at the Liverpool River mouth, and Nhulunbuy (also known as Gove) in the far north-east, on the Gove Peninsula. Gove is the site of large-scale bauxite mining with an associated alumina refinery. Its administrative centre is the town of Nhulunbuy, the fourth-largest population centre in the Northern Territory.

The climate of Arnhem Land is tropical monsoon with a wet and dry season.

Indigenous population and culture

Arnhem Land is composed of many different Aboriginal countries and language groups. North-east Arnhem Land is home to the Yolngu people, one of the largest Indigenous groups in Australia, who have succeeded in maintaining a vigorous traditional culture, and whose name for this area is Miwatj. In West Arnhem Land, large groups include the Bininj people and the Maung people of the Goulburn Islands.

Economy

In 2019, it was announced that NASA had chosen Arnhem Land as the location for a space launch facility. The Arnhem Space Centre was built near Nhulunbuy, employing mostly local labour, and on 27 June 2022, NASA launched the first rocket there, which was the first rocket launch from a commercial spaceport outside the US. Two further launches followed, the third on July 11. Other space companies are interested in using the rocket launch pad, and NASA confirmed that it will use the facility again in the future.

Film
The 2006 film Ten Canoes captures life in Arnhem Land through a story tapping into the Aboriginal mythic past; it was co-directed by one of the indigenous cast members. The film and the documentary about the making of the film, The Balanda and the Bark Canoes, give a remarkable testimony to the indigenous struggle to keep their culture alive – or rather revive it in the wake of considerable relative modernisation and influence of white (balanda) cultural imposition.

High Ground (2020 film), a 2020 feature film directed by Stephen Maxwell Johnson, based on historical fact and reflecting the history and culture of Yolngu people, was filmed in Arnhem land.

Art

The Aboriginal community of Yirrkala, just outside Nhulunbuy, is internationally known for bark paintings, promoting the rights of Indigenous Australians, and as the origin of the yidaki, or didgeridoo. The community of Gunbalanya (previously known as Oenpelli) in Western Arnhem Land is also notable for bark painting. The indigenous inhabitants also create temporary sand sculptures as part of their sacred rituals.

Arnhem Land is also notable for Aboriginal rock art, some examples of which can be found at Ubirr Rock, Injalak Hill, and in the Canon Hill area. Some of these record the early years of European explorers and settlers, sometimes in such detail that Martini–Henry rifles can be identified. They also depict axes, and detailed paintings of aircraft and ships. One remote shelter, several hundred kilometres from Darwin, has a painting of the wharf at Darwin, including building and boats, and Europeans with hats and pipes, some apparently without hands (which they have in their trouser pockets). Near the East Alligator River crossing, a figure was painted of a man carrying a gun and wearing his hair in long pigtails down his back, characteristic of the Chinese labourers brought to Darwin in the late 19th century.

One Yolngu prehistoric stone arrangement at Maccasans Beach near Yirrkala shows the layout of the Makassan praus used for trepang (sea cucumber) fishing in the area. This was a legacy of Yolngu trade links with the people on the Indonesian island of Sulawesi. The trading relationship antedated European settlement by some 200 years.

Aboriginal artists in Arnhem Land are primarily represented by Aboriginal Art Centres, nonprofit, community-owned organisations. In East Arnhem Land, primarily Yolngu Matha-speaking artists are promoted by Buku-Larrnggay Mulka in Yirrkala, Bula'bula Arts in Ramingining, Elcho Island Arts and Crafts on Elcho Island, Gapuwiyak Culture and Arts in Gapuwiyak and Milingimbi Art and Culture on Milingimbi Island. In Central Arnhem Land, Maningrida Arts & Culture in Maningrida promotes the work of a diverse range of Kuninjku, Burarra, and Gurrgoni artists, amongst others. In West Arnhem Land, Injalak Arts in Gunbalanya represents mainly Kunwinjku artists. Ngukurr Arts is located on the Roper River in Southern Arnhem Land. Art is also produced on the many islands of Arnhem Land, and there are art centres on the Anindilyakwa speaking Groote Eylandt (Anindilyakwa Art) and the Maung speaking Goulburn Islands (Mardbalk Arts & Crafts).

Homelands

Arnhem Land is also known for embracing the homeland movement, sometimes referred to as the outstation movement. For many decades prior to 1970, the East Arnhem Land Yolngu people lived on mission stations, such as Yirrkala. From April 1972, Yolngu families began moving away, back to their traditional clan lands. This was instigated by Yolngu people, before there was government support for the outstation movement. The people cleared land for airstrips and built their own houses from local timber, with the help of non-Indigenous people from the mission. The elders of the clans aimed to determine their own futures, basing their societies on Yolngu law, while living and raising their children on their lands in a sustainable and self-sufficient way. In 1985, Laynhapuy Homelands Aboriginal Corporation (LHAC), an Aboriginal corporation, was established to assist the homelands.

Homelands are tiny communities where members of related clan groups live on their traditional land, living according to Yolngu rom (law). There are benefits to the people to be living in these homelands, including:

Homelands also reduce pressure on other Indigenous communities, which are already suffering from problems in the housing, health and education services areas.

In the early 21st century, a focus governments about the "viability" of the homelands has caused tensions and uncertainty within the Arnhem Land community.

In September 2008, then Darwin correspondent for The Age, Lindsay Murdoch, wrote: "Elders tell of their fears that Yolngu culture and society will not survive if clans cannot continue to live on and access their land through homelands. They warn that if services are cut, many of the 800 people in the Laynhapuy homelands will be forced to move to towns such as Yirrkala on the Gove Peninsula, creating new law and order problems, while those who stay will be severely disadvantaged."

In response to changes made by the Northern Territory government surrounding reduced support for the homelands in 2009, the Indigenous leader Patrick Dodson criticised the Northern Territory Government's controversial new policy on remote Aboriginal communities, describing it as a "die on the vine" plan that will "slowly but surely" kill indigenous culture.

Born in the 1930s, Dr Gawirrin Gumana AO is a leader of the Dhalwangu clan, renowned for his artwork and knowledge of traditional culture and law. In May 2009, he had the following to say about the significance of the homelands to his people:

Despite facing government concerns and policy confusion, a number of people have developed commercial enterprises that have centred on using the best elements of their homelands. Indigenous tourism ventures incorporating the controlled use of homelands are now showing signs of success for a select number of Yolngu.

Communities

Gan Gan, aka Gangan,  is a remote inland riverside community, in the traditional lands of the Dhalwaŋu people. There are several well-known artists in the community, notably Malaluba Gumana, Nongirrnga Marawili, Gawarrin Gumana and Garawan Wanambi. Gan Gan is also the site of an event known as the Gan Gan massacre that occurred in 1911, when over 30 men, women and children were killed by colonial police and settlers.
Cannon Hill - family outstation

See also
Arnhem Land tropical savanna
Gabarnmung – Aboriginal archaeological and rock art site
Kakadu National Park
Flora of Kakadu National Park
Protected areas of the Northern Territory
Ubirr
Wongalara Sanctuary

References

Arnhem Land. Its History and Its People. 1954. R. M. & C. H. Berndt. F. W. Cheshire, Melbourne.

External links

Arnhem Region
Gove Online Community Website
Bawaka

 
Regions of the Northern Territory
Arafura Sea
Gulf of Carpentaria